The Nuclear Energy and Industry Workers' Union of Ukraine (Atomprofspilka) is a trade union representing workers in the nuclear power industry in Ukraine.

The union was founded on 23 January 1992, with the merger of the Council of Trade Unions of Nuclear Power Plants, and the Pripyat NGO.  Like both its predecessors, it affiliated to the Federation of Trade Unions of Ukraine.  As of 2022, the union has about 56,000 members.

References

External links

Energy industry trade unions
Trade unions established in 1992
Trade unions in Ukraine